

Public sector

Private sector

Post Graduate & Degree Colleges 
List of Post Graduate & Degree Colleges is below.

Public Sector 
 Edwardes College, Peshawar
 Islamia College Peshawar

Public Sector Boys Only 
 Government College Peshawar
 Government Superior Science College, Peshawar
 Government College Hayatabad Peshawar
 Government Degree College Naguman Peshawar
 Government Degree College Mathra Peshawar
 Government Degree College Badaber Peshawar
 Government Degree College Wadpagga Peshawar
 Government Degree College Chagarmatti Peshawar
 Government Degree College Achyni Payan Peshawar

Private Sector 
 Army Public School & Degree College
 Brains Post Graduate College & University
 Fazaia Degree College, Peshawar

Public Sector Girls Only 
 Government Girls Degree College Dabgari Peshawar
 Government Degree college For women Gulshan Rehman Colony Peshawar
 Government Frontier College For Women Peshawar
 Government Girls Degree College Bacha Khan Kohat Road Peshawar
 Government Girls Degree College Chagarmatti Peshawar
 Government Girls Degree College Hayatabad Peshawar
 Government Girls Degree College Mathra Peshawar
 Government Girls Degree College Nahaqi Peshawar
 Government Girls Degree College No.2 Hayatabad Peshawar
 Government Girls Degree College Zaryab Colony Peshawar

See also 
 Peshawar District
 List of Universities in Pakistan

References 

Universities and colleges in Peshawar
Peshawar-related lists